The Costa Book Award for Short Story, established in 2012, was an annual literary award for short stories, part of the Costa Book Awards.

The awards were dissolved in 2022.

Recipients 
Costa Books of the Year are distinguished with a bold font and a blue ribbon. Award winners are listed in bold.

See also 

 Costa Book Award for Biography
 Costa Book Award for Children's Books
 Costa Book Award for First Novel
 Costa Book Award for Novel
 Costa Book Awards

References

External links 

 Official website

English-language literary awards
Costa Book Awards
Awards established in 2012
Short story awards